Ging is a surname. Notable people with the surname include:

 Billy Ging (1872–1950), American baseball player
 Jack Ging (1931–2022), American actor
 John Ging (born 1965), Irish Army officer and United Nations official

See also
 Gin (name)